Robert Neil Fisher (14 March 1929 – 28 August 2021) was an Australian rules footballer who played with Hawthorn in the Victorian Football League (VFL).

Notes

External links 

1929 births
2021 deaths
Australian rules footballers from Victoria (Australia)
Hawthorn Football Club players